Parviz Shahbazi  is an Iranian filmmaker.

Biography
Shahbazi is a graduate of filmmaking in Iran. During the early 80's he began writing short stories and directing short films. He edited several films and directed 12 short films before making his first feature film, Traveler from the South, in 1996.
'Talla’ is his latest feature movie.

Film career
His debut feature film, Traveler from the South (1996) as well as his second film, Whispers (2000) went to countless festivals and brought him international recognition, collecting several prizes along the way.

In 2002, his third film, Deep Breath was shown at the Directors' Fortnight at Cannes Film Festival to great success. Among other accolades it won a FIPRESCI award at Pusan and the Jury special award at Turin as well as the Best Film award at the Belgrade Author Festival.

In 2016 Malaria was shown at the 73rd Venice film festival and won the Grand Prix at the Warsaw International Film Festival (2016).

Filmography

Awards
Grand Prix at the Warsaw International Film Festival (2016)

PIFF - FIPRESCI Prize - 2003 - Nafas-e amigh (Deep Breath)

Fajr Film Festival - Crystal Simorgh - four times for Traveller from the south 1996; 2003 - Nafas-e amigh; Karat 14 - 2008; Darband - 2012

Annonay film festival France - Best feature film - Traveller from the south - 1998

Zanzibar film festival - Silver boat - Whispers - 2000

Torinno film festival - Deep Breath - 2003

Dhaka International Film Festival - Best directing - Darband - 2013 and Malaria - 2017

 Cinequest Film Festival - Best Feature - 1999 Mosafer-e jonub (The Traveller from the South)

TIFF - Gold Award - 1997 Mosafer-e jonub

Isfahan International Festival of Films - Golden Butterfly - 1996 Mosafer-e jonub

References

External links
 "Parviz Shahbazi website"
 "Parviz Shahbazi on Facebook"

 "Cannes Film Festival 2003"
 "Interview October 1997"

1962 births
Living people
Iranian film directors
Iranian screenwriters
Crystal Simorgh for Best Director winners
Crystal Simorgh for Best Screenplay winners